Jeremy O'Brien (born 1975, Australia) is a  physicist who researches in quantum optics, optical quantum metrology and quantum information science. He co-founded and serves as CEO of the quantum computing firm PsiQuantum. Formerly, he was Professorial Research Fellow in Physics and Electrical Engineering at the University of Bristol, and director of its Centre for Quantum Photonics.

His work in optical quantum computing has included the demonstration of the first optical quantum controlled NOT gate.

Honours and awards
2009 European Quantum Information Young Investigator Award
2010 Adolph Lomb Medal of the Optical Society of America
2010 IUPAP Prize in Atomic Molecular and Optical Physics
2010 Moseley medal and prize of the Institute of Physics
2010 Daiwa Adrian Prize
2011 Elected to the Global Young Academy

Selected publications

References

External links
 Jeremy O'Brien: Home page. Department of Physics, University of Bristol.
   Professor Jeremy O'Brien. Department of Electrical & Electronic Engineering, University of Bristol.
 Jeremy O'Brien: Recent publications. Quantum Computation & Information Group, University of Bristol.

Academics of the University of Bristol
Living people
1975 births
Australian physicists
Quantum physicists
Quantum information scientists
Fellows of the American Physical Society